Clarktown is an unincorporated community and census-designated place in southeastern Jefferson Township, Scioto County, Ohio, United States. As of the 2010 census it had a population of 958.

Long Run, a tributary of the Rocky Fork of the Little Scioto River, flows past the community.

References

Census-designated places in Scioto County, Ohio